Reclaiming the Glory was a professional wrestling tournament held between June 2, 2007 and September 1, 2007. Promoted by the National Wrestling Alliance, the tournament was the result of the dissolution of the licensing agreement between the NWA and Total Nonstop Action Wrestling. The tournament included 16 international wrestlers fighting to become the new NWA World Heavyweight Champion.

The Tournament

Background
On May 13, 2007 NWA Executive Director Bob Trobich announced that the NWA was severing all ties with TNA Wrestling leaving the NWA World Heavyweight Championship and the NWA World Tag Team Championship vacant.  Shortly after this, the Reclaiming the Glory tournament was announced to crown a new NWA Worlds Champion.  16 Men were chosen to compete in the tournament with matches taking place throughout the National Wrestling Alliance’s members and affiliates as well as selected matches in non-affiliated groups Chikara, New England Championship Wrestling and IWA Puerto Rico.

Lou Thesz Bracket

Round One

(June 9) Fred Sampson defeated Glamor Boy Shane in Mesa, Arizona
(June 2) Brent Albright defeated Osamu Nishimura in Salyersville, Kentucky

Quarterfinals

(June 30) Brent Albright defeated Fred Sampson in Chula Vista, California, to win the Lou Thesz Bracket.

Terry Funk Bracket

Round One

(June 16) Claudio Castagnoli defeated Pepper Parks in Danvers, Massachusetts
(June 30) Sicodelico, Jr. defeated Roughneck Ryan in Lebanon, Tennessee

Quarterfinals

(July 21) Claudio Castagnoli defeated Sicodelico, Jr. in Wallingford, Connecticut, to win the Terry Funk Bracket.

Jack Brisco Bracket

First Round

(June 16) Bryan Danielson defeated Nelson Creed in Vancouver, British Columbia, Canada
(June 30) Fergal Devitt defeated Mikey Nicholls in Quincy, Massachusetts

Quarterfinals

(July 21) Bryan Danielson defeated Fergal Devitt in North Tonawanda, New York, to win the Jack Brisco Bracket

Harley Race Bracket

Round One

(June 2) Chad Parham defeated Damian Wayne in Cornelia, Georgia
(June 2) Adam Pearce defeated Aaron Aguilera in Lodi, New Jersey

Quarterfinals

(July 13) Adam Pearce defeated Chad Parham in Covina, California, to win the Harley Race Bracket.

The Final Four

1.  Adam Pearce took the place of Bryan Danielson (see below)

Semi-Finals

(August 18) Bryan Danielson defeated Adam Pearce in North Vancouver, British Columbia, Canada
(August 12) Brent Albright defeated Claudio Castagnoli in Charlotte, North Carolina

Finals

NOTE: A week prior to the finals of the tournament, finalist Bryan Danielson suffered a fractured orbital bone in a match with Japanese fighter Takeshi Morishima.  As a result, Adam Pearce was reinserted into the tournament and took Danielson’s place in the finals.  Danielson, wearing a protective eye patch, did have a hand in the match as the special enforcer to prevent interference from Pearce’s manager C. Edward Vander Pyle.  When the assigned referee was knocked unconscious during the match, Danielson took over and counted the pinfall.

(September 1) Adam Pearce defeated Brent Albright in Bayamon, Puerto Rico to become the new NWA World Heavyweight Champion.

Aftermath
Despite the controversial victory, Pearce would go on to a lengthy and successful eleven-month reign as champion before finally losing the title to Brent Albright on August 2, 2008 in New York City.  Due to scheduling conflicts, Bryan Danielson never received his shot at the championship.

In the years following the tournament, many of the participants were signed to successful careers in WWE. Claudio Castagnoli became Cesaro, Fred Sampson as Darren Young, Fergal Devitt as Finn Balor, and Bryan Danielson as Daniel Bryan. Adam Pearce was also signed as a trainer.

See also
2007 in professional wrestling

References

External links
National Wrestling Alliance’s official website

2007 in professional wrestling
National Wrestling Alliance shows
Professional wrestling tournaments